Castra Centum Putei was a fort in the Roman province of Dacia.

See also
List of castra

External links
Roman castra from Romania - Google Maps / Earth

Notes

Roman Dacia
Archaeological sites in Romania
Roman legionary fortresses in Romania
History of Banat
Historic monuments in Caraș-Severin County